Tafese Seboka Jimma (born 29 September 1993) is an Ethiopian athlete specialising in the 3000 metres steeplechase. He competed at the 2015 World Championships and 2016 Olympics without qualifying for the final.

Competition record

References

1993 births
Living people
Place of birth missing (living people)
Ethiopian male long-distance runners
Ethiopian male steeplechase runners
World Athletics Championships athletes for Ethiopia
Athletes (track and field) at the 2016 Summer Olympics
Olympic athletes of Ethiopia
20th-century Ethiopian people
21st-century Ethiopian people